is a Japanese manga series written and illustrated by Ayako Noda. It was serialized in Shogakukan's seinen manga magazine Monthly Ikki from October 2012 to March 2014, with its chapters collected in two tankōbon volumes.

Publication
Written and illustrated by Ayako Noda, Watashi no Uchū was serialized in Shogakukan's seinen manga magazine Monthly Ikki from October 25, 2012, to March 24, 2014. Shogakukan collected its chapters in two tankōbon volumes, released on August 30, 2013, and August 29, 2014.

In France, the manga was licensed by Casterman.

Volume list

References

Further reading

External links
 

Metafictional comics
Seinen manga
Shogakukan manga